Sir William Lowther (18 August 1639 – 7 December 1705) was an English landowner and MP.

He was the eldest son of Sir William Lowther of Swillington, near Leeds and educated at Gray's Inn and Balliol College, Oxford. He succeeded his father in 1688 and was knighted the same year.

He was appointed High Sheriff of Yorkshire for 1681. He was commissioner for the Aire and Calder Navigation in 1699 and elected Member of Parliament for Pontefract in 1695, sitting until 1698.

He died at Little Preston Hall near Leeds in 1705 and was buried at Kippax. He had married Catherine, the daughter of Thomas Harrison of Middlesex, and had ten children:
Sir William Lowther, 1st Baronet (1663–1729)
son, first apprenticed to a merchant, then joined the Army
son, first apprenticed to a merchant, then joined the Army
son, joined the Army
Richard Lowther, merchant, married successively the daughters of Sir Christopher Wandesford and Sir John Fenwick.
Christopher Lowther (d. 1718), merchant, of Little Preston, married Elizabeth Maude and had issue
Gerard Lowther, lawyer, d.v.p. age 23
Catherine Lowther, married Henry Slingsby
Mary Lowther, married John Stanhope.

He had a falling-out with his eldest son, William, over his marriage to the daughter of Lord Maynard, because of the reduction in the estates that would be entailed by her jointure. He left the majority of his estate to Christopher, his younger son.

References

 

English MPs 1695–1698
1639 births
1705 deaths
Members of Gray's Inn
Alumni of Balliol College, Oxford
17th-century English landowners
18th-century English landowners
High Sheriffs of Yorkshire
William